Nbeika  is a town and commune in Mauritania, located in the Tagant Region.

As of the 2013 census, there were 20766 inhabitants of Nbeika.

References

Communes of Mauritania